Beyond Plaza is a shopping center in Yonghe District, New Taipei, Taiwan that opened in April 2000. The original name of the mall was Pacific Department Store, but later changed to its current name in June 2014. It is the first and largest shopping mall in the district. The main core stores of the mall include Century Asia Cinemas, Mo Mo Paradise, Muji, Eslite Bookstore and ABC Mart. The mall is located in close proximity to Dingxi and Yongan Market metro stations.

Floor Guide

See also
 List of tourist attractions in Taiwan

References

External links

2000 establishments in Taiwan
Shopping malls in New Taipei
Shopping malls established in 2000